George Jefferson Hassell (July 5, 1888 – February 10, 1928) was an American serial killer and mass murderer who killed his wife and eight children (ranging in age between 1 and 21 years old) on December 5, 1926, in Farwell, Texas. He also killed his wife and three stepchildren in 1917 in California.

Family background
Hassell was born in Smithville, Texas, the youngest of seven children. After his brother Thomas died from being kicked in the head by a mule, he married his brother's widow, Susan Ferguson of Oklahoma. According to Hassell, his mother died in 1901 and his father died in 1905. Believing his stepmother had poisoned his father, Hassell said he'd planned to kill her and anyone with her, but said "I got too much whiskey and didn't use any gun." Hassell also said he served prison time for embezzlement.

Crime
On the night of December 5, 1926, Hassell and his wife argued over him raping and impregnating Ferguson's underage daughter Maudie, who was Hassell's own niece as well as his stepdaughter. Hassell proceeded to strike his wife in the face repeatedly with a ballpeen hammer. After the murder of his wife, he moved between each member of the family's bedrooms, using a straight razor and stockings to kill them, in order from youngest to oldest. He woke the two eldest boys and a scuffle ensued, ending with Hassell killing them with a shotgun and an axe. All of the bodies were then stored in the newly dug root cellar by the house. The eldest Hassell son, Alton, was threshing wheat in Clovis, New Mexico, for extra money and was not supposed to come home for another four days. Hassell decided to wait for him. in the meantime, he cleaned up the blood and buried the bodies. When Alton returned, Hassell told him that the family had gone to Shallowater, Texas, to visit an aunt. The two men killed a chicken and cooked dinner, and then went to their respective bedrooms. Hassell later said he needed to drink whiskey to work up the nerve to kill again. After getting drunk, he grabbed the shotgun, went to Alton's bedroom, and shot him in the head as he was sleeping.

The victims
 Susie, age 40
 Alton, age 21
 David, age 15
 Maudie, age 13
 Russell, age 11
 Virgil, age 7
 Johnnie, age 6
 Nannie Martha, age 4
 Samuel, age 1
 Marie Vogel (Whittier, Ca)
 Vogel adopted son, 8 (Whittier, Ca)
 Vogel adopted daughter, 2 (Whittier, CA)
 Vogel adopted daughter, 1 (Whittier, Ca)

Arrest, trial, and execution
Hassell claimed that he and his family were returning to Oklahoma, and sold all of their belongings in a large yard sale. During the auction, a wagon ran over the sinkhole and aroused the suspicion of law enforcement. Soon afterward, Hassell unsuccessfully attempted suicide, and excavations revealed the remains in the root cellar. He also confessed the murder of the members of his other family in 1917, Marie Vogel and her three adoptive children, two of which were adopted from Colorado: a boy c. 8, a girl c. 5 and an infant c. 1. They were living under the family name "Baker" in Whittier, California. Hassell said he killed his common-law wife and three children during an argument over whether he would join the Army to fight in World War I. His confession was corroborated after he directed the police to the location of the bodies. Hassell said he confessed to the earlier murders to ensure no one was wrongfully accused of committing them.

After Hassell confessed, a short trial was convened, and Farwell and its sister city of Texico, New Mexico, took on a carnival atmosphere. He was only tried for Alton's murder. During his trial, Hassell claimed the initial murders were a spur of the moment crime and that he couldn't stop. A psychiatrist declared Hassell sane, and he was found guilty of murder and sentenced to death.

At the time, death row for men and the execution chamber were both at Huntsville Unit. On February 10, 1928, George Hassell became the 37th man to be put to death in the electric chair in the state of Texas.

He is buried at Captain Joe Byrd Cemetery.

Motive
Hassell had a lengthy history of criminal behavior. A psychiatric report at the time characterizes him as a sociopath. Hassell had  allegedly been thinking about murder since he was 17 and before joining the Army.

See also 
 List of homicides in California
 List of serial killers in the United States

References

1888 births
1917 murders in the United States
1926 murders in the United States
1928 deaths
20th-century executions by Texas
20th-century executions of American people
American mass murderers
American murderers of children
American people convicted of murder
American sailors
Executed American serial killers
Executed mass murderers
Familicides
Mass murder in 1917
Mass murder in 1926
Mass murder in California
Mass murder in Texas
Mass murder in the United States
Massacres in 1926
People convicted of murder by Texas
People executed by Texas by electric chair
People executed for murder
People from Bastrop County, Texas
People from Parmer County, Texas
People with antisocial personality disorder
Serial mass murderers
Stabbing attacks in the United States